Cul-de-sac Glacier is a glacier in the Alaska Range of Denali National Park and Preserve in the U.S. state of Alaska. The glacier begins in the Kichatna Mountains on the side of Kichatna Spire, moving north. Its run-off and that of  neighboring Shelf and Shadows glaciers feeds the west fork of the Yentna River.

See also
 List of glaciers

References

Glaciers of Matanuska-Susitna Borough, Alaska
Glaciers of Denali National Park and Preserve
Glaciers of Alaska